The 2019–20 Clemson Tigers men's basketball team represented Clemson University during the 2019–20 NCAA Division I men's basketball season. The Tigers were led by tenth-year head coach Brad Brownell and played their home games at Littlejohn Coliseum in Clemson, South Carolina as members of the Atlantic Coast Conference.

On January 11, 2020, Clemson defeated North Carolina 79–76 in overtime to win their first ever game in Chapel Hill in program history. Entering the game, the Tar Heels had been 59–0 at home against the Tigers, which was an NCAA record for longest win streak by one team at home versus one opponent.

The Tigers finished the season 16–15, and 9–11 in ACC play.  The team was scheduled to play Florida State in the quarterfinals of the ACC tournament before the tournament was cancelled due to the COVID-19 pandemic.  The NCAA tournament and NIT were also cancelled due to the pandemic.

Previous season
The Tigers finished the 2018–19 season 20–14, 9–9 in ACC play to finish in a tie for eighth place. They lost in the first round of the ACC tournament to NC State. They received an at-large bid to the NIT where they defeated Wright State before losing to Wichita State in the second round.

Offseason

Coaching changes

Clemson fired assistant coach Steve Smith, for comments made on FBI wire tap in relation to the 2017–18 NCAA Division I men's basketball corruption scandal.  As a replacement, Clemson hired Anthony Goins.

Departures

Incoming transfers

2019 recruiting class

World University Games

On August 15, 2018 it was announced that Clemson would represent Team USA in men's basketball at the 2019 Summer Universiade (World University Games) in Naples, Italy. The Tigers competed from July 3–11, 2019 in a 16 team, 4 pool qualification followed by two 8 team brackets - one to determine 1st-8th place, the second determining 9th-16th place.

Clemson, as Team USA, was placed in Pool C with China, Finland, and Ukraine. The Tigers would go 3–0 in pool play to qualify for the 1st-8th classification bracket. Clemson would then proceed to go 3–0 in the main bracket to go undefeated for the tournament and capture the gold medal, giving the United States its 15th gold medal in men's basketball at the event.
 July 4 - USA 69, Finland 65 (pool C)
 July 5 - USA 58, Ukraine 57 (pool C)
 July 6 - USA 99, China 70 (pool C)
 July 8 - USA 76, Germany 74 (quarterfinal)
 July 9 - USA 75, Israel 73 (semifinal)
 July 11 - USA 85, Ukraine 63 (gold-medal game)

Roster

Schedule and results
Source:

|-
!colspan=9 style=| Exhibition

|-
!colspan=9 style=| Regular season

|-
!colspan=12 style=|ACC Men's tournament

Rankings

*AP does not release post-NCAA tournament rankings^Coaches did not release a Week 2 poll.

See also
2019–20 Clemson Tigers women's basketball team

References

Clemson Tigers men's basketball seasons
Clemson